is a Japanese video game designer, director, and producer. He used to work at Technosoft, Compile and Eighting, and is currently working at Taito since 2017. He is also a writer for the Game Culture Preservation Institute(IGCC).

Early years
Toyama started his path in the video game industry after his enjoyment of playing Space Invaders. He had read magazines that featured games like Space Invaders, Star Wars, and Gundam. He always wanted to enjoy those games at home. He originally wanted to either get a Sharp MZ-80 or an NEC PC-8001, but in the end, he started with a Hitachi Basic Master Level 2. After testing the games on it, he had no choice but to do game programming on his own.

Career

Technosoft (1987-1989)

Toyama started at Technosoft when he was a teenager. He started with being a designer for the game, Feedback, then later a planner and programmer for Herzog

Compile (1989-1992)

Eighting (1994-2017)

Taito (2017-present)

Works

References

External links
  (Japanese)
  Yuichi Toyama at IMDb
  Yuichi Toyama Rap sheet at MobyGames
  Twitter

Living people
Year of birth missing (living people)
Japanese video game designers
Japanese video game directors
Japanese video game producers
Japanese video game programmers
Taito people